The Ojdula (also: Orbai) is a left tributary of the Râul Negru in Romania. It flows into the Râul Negru near the city Târgu Secuiesc.

References

Rivers of Romania
Rivers of Covasna County